Kalimeris incisa, common name kalimeris or Japanese aster,  is a species of flowering plant in the family Asteraceae.

Description
It is an herbaceous perennial plant with dark-green leaves and showy flowers with a yellow center and light blue petals. They bloom from June to September.

Distribution
This species is native to the Eastern Asia, Siberia, China, Korea and Japan.

Habitat
It prefers meadows and lowlands.

References
 Hong-ya Gu and Peter C. Hoch (1997) -  "Systematics of Kalimeris (Asteraceae: Astereae)"
 Missouri Botanical Garden
 Plants for a future

Astereae